Marshall Wace LLP is a hedge fund based in London, founded by Paul Marshall and Ian Wace in 1997. Marshall serves as chairman and chief investment officer, and Wace as a chief executive officer & chief risk officer. The company is recognized as one of the world's largest hedge fund managers.

Overview

Before starting the fund, Paul Marshall was Head of European Equities at Mercury Asset Management, whilst Ian Wace was Head of Equities Trading at Deutsche Bank. In 1997, Marshall and Wace launched Marshall Wace; they were managing $50 million — $25 million from George Soros and $25 million sourced via family and friends. 

The firm manages more than $64 billion as of January 2022 and operates from fund management offices in London, New York, Hong Kong, Shanghai, and Singapore. The head office in London is situated on Sloane Street.

The company is a founding member of the Hedge Fund Standards Board (HFSB) and a member of the Alternative Investment Management Association (AIMA). 

In August 2014, Marshall Wace made $36 million from going short on the collapse of the Portuguese bank Banco Espírito Santo. 

In 2015 Kohlberg Kravis Roberts agreed to buy a 24.9 percent stake in Marshall Wace.

In 2020, Marshall Wace announced its plans to raise $1 billion for a new green hedge fund which will depend on the environmental and ethical attributes for trading stocks.

Investment approach

Marshall Wace manages several long-short equity funds.

Products
Marshall Wace runs a proprietary alpha capture system TOPS (Trade Optimised Portfolio System), which polls the investment ideas of equity sell-side practitioners (generalists, sector specialists, strategists, and economists) around the world and uses algorithms to analyse and optimise this information into liquid equity portfolios. The company's funds include UCITS-compliant vehicles.

Assets under management

References

External links
 
 AIMA
 Hedge Fund Standards Board

Hedge fund firms in the United Kingdom
Hedge funds
Financial services companies established in 1997
Investment management companies of the United States